Edward West "Whitey" Ritterson (April 26, 1855 – July 28, 1917) was a professional baseball player who played mainly as a catcher for one season in the National League with the Philadelphia Athletics in .

Ritterson was born in Philadelphia, Pennsylvania in 1855. Before his National League career, he played for the independent Philadelphia Centennials. Ritterson played an exhibition match for the Athletics in April 1876 before making his official debut on May 2, in which he had one hit in an 11–5 win against the New York Mutuals. He played his final game on August 9, after he refused to catch in the ninth inning as he said his hands were hurt. Ritterson joined the Ludlows of Kentucky in 1877 but injured his hands during a practice match against the Louisville Grays and was fired. Louisville outfielder George Hall organized a collection from the players to allow Ritterson to return to Philadelphia.

Ritterson was married to Amanda Burke Ritterson. He died suddenly in Sellersville, Pennsylvania on July 28, 1917. Ritterson is interred at Reform Cemetery in Perkasie, Pennsylvania.

References

External links

Major League Baseball catchers
Philadelphia Athletics (NL) players
Baseball players from Philadelphia
19th-century baseball players
1855 births
1917 deaths